Castle Douglas High School is a comprehensive state school situated in Castle Douglas in the historical county of Kirkcudbrightshire. It has approximately 550 students and provides education from Secondary 1 to Secondary 6. Castle Douglas High School is run in conjunction with Dalry Secondary School by the same management team.

Notes and references

External links
Castle Douglas High School website
Castle Douglas High School's page on Scottish Schools Online

Secondary schools in Dumfries and Galloway
Castle Douglas